Velma is an unincorporated community in Arthur County, Nebraska, United States.

History
A post office was established at Velma in 1914, and remained in operation until 1943.

References

Unincorporated communities in Arthur County, Nebraska
Unincorporated communities in Nebraska